The Madonna with Child and Saints is a painting by the Italian late Renaissance painter Luca Signorelli, executed around 1519-1523. It is housed in the Museo Nazionale di Castel Sant Angelo, Rome, Italy.
The picture is a traditional Holy Conversation composition.

History
The painting was commissioned by the Brotherhood of St. Jerome in Arezzo for their seat. The work was executed in Cortona and was brought to Arezzo by the painter himself, who was then in his seventies (here, he resided in the Vasari family's house and met the young Giorgio Vasari, his future biographer, who started to practice painting  after Signorelli's suggestion).

It is the last work by Signorelli, who died after returning to Cortona.

Sources

16th-century paintings
Angels in art
Paintings of the Madonna and Child by Luca Signorelli